Mariusz Pawlak  (born 19 January 1972, in Gdańsk) is a Polish former professional footballer and currently the manager of Wisła Puławy.

Career

Club
In June 2007, he joined Polonia Warsaw on a two-year contract.

International
Pawlak made one appearance for the Poland national football team.

Coaching career
On 6 November 2019, Pawlak was appointed manager of Wisła Puławy. With his team, he was promoted to the II liga in the 2020-21 season.

References

External links
 
 
 

1972 births
Living people
Polish footballers
Poland international footballers
Lechia Gdańsk players
Polonia Warsaw players
Dyskobolia Grodzisk Wielkopolski players
Olimpia Grudziądz players
Sportspeople from Gdańsk
Znicz Pruszków managers
Olimpia Grudziądz managers
Association football defenders
Polish football managers
I liga managers
II liga managers